The California Reparations Task Force is a non-regulatory state agency in California established by California Assembly Bill 3121 in 2020 to study and develop reparation proposals for African Americans, especially those who are descendants of persons enslaved in the United States. The task force is designed to recommend ways to educate the California public of the task force's findings and to propose remedies. Five members are appointed by the Governor, two members are appointed by the President pro Tempore of the Senate, and two members by the Speaker of the Assembly. Members are: senator Steven Bradford, Amos C. Brown, Cheryl Grills, Lisa Holder, assembly member Reginald Jones-Sawyer, Jovan Scott Lewis, Kamilah Moore (Chair), councilmember Monica Montgomery Steppe, and councilmember Donald K. Tamaki. Eight members are African American and the ninth Japanese American.

California is the first U.S. state to establish a body to study the long history of terror and oppression against African Americans and recommend reparations. Germany made payments to Holocaust survivors and the United States made payments to Americans who were interned during World War II by the Franklin Roosevelt administration for being Japanese. In one case a family's land was taken through eminent domain and became a state park.

The task force met in 2021. The task force received testimony about segregation, redlining, voter restrictions, and other forms of discrimination in 2022 and was discussing whether it was appropriate to pay reparations to all African Americans in California or only those whose ancestors were enslaved. A report is expected in 2023. The committee was presented with calculations for certain scenarios that include figures amounting to hundreds of thousands of dollars in reparations for each California resident who can prove they are the descendant of an enslaved person. One estimate suggested "just under $1 million for each Black Californian descended from slaves," based on a calculation of $127,000 per year of life expectancy gap between Black and White Californians. Kamilah Moore noted that California could not afford to pay such a debt directly, and that the reparations might not come in the form of cash, but equivalent value, such as free health care programs or medical clinics.

See also
Shirley Weber
Bruce's Beach
Eminent Domain
Redlining
Callie House
War reparations

References

Reparations for slavery
Government agencies established in 2020
2020 establishments in California